Dimeco Childress (born August 19, 1980) is an American former basketball player. He is known for his collegiate career at East Tennessee State University (ETSU) between 1998–99 and 2001–02. During his four years as a Buccaneer he scored 1,287 points and twice led the team in scoring. As a senior in 2001–02 he led the team 17.5 points per game and 75 total assists. On February 16, 2002 Childress scored a career-high 42 points, good enough for the third-highest single game output in ETSU history. That season, the Buccaneers went 11–5 in Southern Conference (SoCon) play, tying them for first place in the North Division. The SoCon coaches selected Childress as their player of the year; due to the conference's media choosing VMI's Jason Conley as their player of the year, the two players shared the award in 2001–02.

After his college career ended Childress did not get selected in the 2002 NBA Draft.

References

External links
College statistics @ sports-reference.com

1980 births
Living people
American men's basketball players
Basketball players from Tennessee
East Tennessee State Buccaneers men's basketball players
People from Columbia, Tennessee
Shooting guards